Cardell Glacier is a glacier draining the north slopes of Roygos Ridge and flowing northwestwards into Darbel Bay between Shanty Point and Panther Cliff, on the west coast of Graham Land, Antarctica.

History
Cardell Glacier was photographed by Hunting Aerosurveys Ltd in 1955–57, and mapped from these photos by the Falkland Islands Dependencies Survey. The glacier was named by the UK Antarctic Place-Names Committee in 1959 for John D.M. Cardell, English ophthalmic surgeon, who evolved the first satisfactory snow goggle design combining adequate protection and ventilation with safety and sufficient visual field.

See also
 List of glaciers in the Antarctic
 Glaciology

References
 

Glaciers of Loubet Coast